In 2018 and 2019, reports of antisemitism in the United States was reported to have increased compared to previous years according to statistics collected by both the Federal Bureau of Investigation and the Anti-Defamation League. These statistics include both violent antisemitic attacks on Jews and cases of harassment.

2013 knockout game
During the 2013 knockout game spate of violent assaults, all reported "knockout" assaults in New York City targeted Jews. ABC Nightline reported that New York City police believed that antisemitism was likely to be a motive in the attacks, as all eight victims were identified as Jewish.

Brooklyn assaults
2019 saw a spate of attacks in which pedestrians wearing identifiably Jewish clothing were assaulted, beaten and often knocked to the ground by an assailant or group of assailants, many of whom shouted antisemitic slurs.  The assailants were black and Hispanic.

One assailant, Tiffany Harris, who was released without bail after attacking a Jewish woman, attacked three other Jewish women the very next day; all of the victims were dressed in distinctively Jewish clothing.

Although the Williamsburg and Crown Heights neighborhoods of Brooklyn where most of the assaults have taken place are experiencing gentrification, no similar assaults have been reported on the gentrifiers, although their clothing makes them easy to identify.

Writing in neoconservative magazine Commentary, Brookings Institute fellow Jamie Kirchick said in 2018 that antisemitism has been a particular problem in parts of America's black community since the split between the mainstream Civil rights movement led by Martin Luther King Jr. and the more radical Black Power movement of the late 1960s. Kirchick says that leaders on the political left continue to foment antisemitism.

A 2019 study found that 28% of African Americans believed that they were seeing more Black people that they personally knew express antisemitism than in the past. In the same study, 19% of African Americans believed that Jewish people were impeding Black progress in America. Four percent (4%) of African Americans self-identified as being Black Hebrew Israelites in 2019.

Maugham Elementary School Adolf Hitler assignment controversy

In Early April 2021, a fifth-grade teacher at Maugham Elementary School, a public grammar school in Tenafly, New Jersey, instructed a 5th grade student to dress up as Adolf Hitler and write a first-person essay from the perspective of the Nazi leader touting his "accomplishments" as a part of a class assignment. The student wrote a biography of Hitler that glorified the Nazi leader, stated that Hitler's "greatest accomplishment was uniting a great mass of German and Austrian people" in his support, framed the Holocaust in a positive light, and added that Hitler was "pretty great". The student's essay was displayed publicly within the school's hallway during the month of April. In May 2021, the details of the school assignment became known to the public, leading to outrage in the community, which has a substantial Jewish population. After initially defending the teacher and the school's actions and asserting that "it is unfair to judge any student or teacher in this matter", the board of Tenafly Public Schools suspended the teacher and the principal of the school with pay in June 2021 and opened an investigation into the incident.

List of violent attacks (in chronological order)

 2003 Murder of Ariel Sellouk 
 2006 Seattle Jewish Federation shooting at the Jewish Federation of Greater Seattle building in Seattle, Washington by Naveed Haq. 1 dead and 6 others injured.
 2009 United States Holocaust Memorial Museum shooting
 2014 Overland Park Jewish Community Center shooting at the Jewish Community Center of Greater Kansas City and Village Shalom in Overland Park, Kansas by former Klansman Frazier Glenn Miller. 3 people died in the shooting.
 2018 Murder of Blaze Bernstein at Borrego Park in Orange County, California by Atomwaffen Division (AWD) member Samuel Woodard in Orange County, California.
 2018 Pittsburgh synagogue shooting at Tree of Life - Or L'Simcha Congregation by Gab user Robert Bowers in Pittsburgh, Pennsylvania. 11 dead and 6 others injured.
 2019 Poway synagogue shooting at the Chabad of Poway by John Timothy Earnest in Poway, California. 1 dead and 3 others injured
 2019 Jersey City shooting at JC Kosher Supermarket by Black Hebrew Israelites David Anderson and Francine Graham in Jersey City, New Jersey. 5 dead and 3 others injured (including perpetrators)
 2019 Monsey Hanukkah stabbing at Forshay Road in Monsey, New York by Black Hebrew Israelites member Grafton E. Thomas. 5 injured. Three months after the attack, 72-year-old victim Josef Neumann died from his wounds.
 2021 Beating of Joseph Borgen in Times Square. Kippah-wearing American called a "dirty Jew", pepper-sprayed, concussed, bludgeoned, and kicked and punched in broad daylight by several pro-Palestinian demonstrators, including Waseem Awawdeh, who said afterward: "if I could do it again, I would do it again."
 2022 Colleyville synagogue hostage crisis. Four hostages including the Rabbi taken at a synagogue in Colleyville, Texas.

See also
 History of antisemitism in the United States
 List of antisemitic incidents in the United States

References